Alexandra Föster (born 13 January 2002) is a German rower. She won a gold medal in the single scull at the World U23 Championships in 2021 and 2022 and a bronze medal at the 2022 European Rowing Championships.

References

External links 
 

2002 births
Living people
People from Meschede
Sportspeople from Arnsberg (region)
German female rowers
21st-century German women